Daramyn Tömör-Ochir (spelled Daramiin Tɵmɵr-Oçir between 1931 and 1941 and  before 1931, 1921 – 2 October 1985) was a Mongolian politician and adherent of Marxism–Leninism. He served as a member of the Politburo of the Mongolian People's Revolutionary Party, the ruling communist party in Mongolia, during the late 1950s and early 1960s. In 1962, he was expelled as a 'nationalist' from the Politburo after having supported celebrations in honour of the 800th birthday of Genghis Khan. Some time later, he was also expelled from the party, and his life ended in 1985 when he was brutally murdered.

Early life
Tömör-Ochir grew up as an orphan. Around the age of 15 he rented himself out to shear wool and do other jobs. Some years later he then went on to pursue an education at the then recently founded National University of Mongolia. In 1950 Tömör-Ochir, seen as one of the new Mongolian intellectuals, signed a collective letter in which the possibility of socialism in Mongolia without joining the Soviet Union was doubted. The letter led to an investigation by Mongolian Prime Minister Khorloogiin Choibalsan and nationalist supporters as Choibalsan had recently fallen out with Joseph Stalin of the Soviet Union. The later Mongolian Prime Minister Yumjaagiin Tsedenbal did however support Tömör-Ochir during the investigation. In 1953 Tömör-Ochir earned his Master in Philosophy from Moscow State University. In his own country in 1957 he received the title of professor.

Political career
Tömör-Ochir became politically active during the early years of the Tsedenbal rule. Tsedenbal had succeeded Choibalsan, who died in 1952. Tömör-Ochir became member of the Politburo of the Mongolian People's Revolutionary Party (MPRP). By 1956 Tsendenbal started his criticism of intellectuals to which Tömör-Ochir assisted. In 1959, Tömör-Ochir personally joined in this criticism and wrote an article against Mongolian author and linguist Byambyn Rinchen, denouncing him for his nationalism. While at first Tsendenbal was impressed with Tömör-Ochir and his comprehension of the Marxist–Leninist thought he later grew suspicious of him, seeing him as an individualist and nationalist. Tömör-Ochir was however still elected as an academician to the Mongolian Academy of Sciences in 1961. By 1962, he came to retract some of his earlier ideas. He withdrew his earlier support for a unification with the Soviet Union and in book on the history of the MPRP he criticized the non-Marxist early years. In the same year he also wished to see his criticisms of intellectuals and Rinchen withdrawn. 1962 was also the year celebrating 800 years since the birth of Genghis Khan. Several celebrations were planned including a commemorative stamp and series of postcards. A monument of Genghis Khan was also placed in Dadal, his birthplace. Tömör-Ochir joined these celebrations and organized a symposium for academics and scholars on Genghis Khan. The event ended with applause, cheers and chants for Genghis Khan. Informants for the Soviet Union security agency KGB singled out Tömör-Ochir as ringleader. Tsedenbal then had him removed from the Politburo as a 'nationalist' on 10 September 1962. In the autobiography of Jamsrangiin Sambuu, the effective president of Mongolia between 1954 and 1972, he claims that Tömör-Ochir was expelled from power not about the dispute of Genghis Khan, but rather because of differences in opinion regarding Mongolia's role in the Sino-Soviet split between Tömör-Ochir and Tsedenbal.

Later life and death
After his expulsion from the Politburo, Tömör-Ochir wished to translate Karl Marx's book Das Kapital into Mongolian. His request was refused and he was sent to Bayankhongor Province to lead a construction office. After the office performed poorly, Tömör-Ochir was expelled from the MPRP and later fired from his job. He then returned to the capital city of Ulan Bator where he was jailed briefly only to be sent into internal exile to Khövsgöl Province shortly after. He was allowed to return to Ulan Bator for medical reasons and was later sent to the city of Darkhan in 1968. In Darkhan he worked in a local museum called Friendship while his wife, Ninjbadgar, worked at the polytechnic institute. In 1984, Tsedenbal stepped down as party leader and one year later Ninjbadgar saw a possibility to request an appeal for reconsideration of the case of Tömör-Ochir in Ulan Bator. While she was away, Tömör-Ochir was killed with an axe in his apartment in Darkhan on 2 October 1985. The killer(s) were never caught, and the motive has yet to be revealed. Tömör-Ochir's family blames the KGB.

References

1921 births
1985 deaths
Moscow State University alumni
Mongolian communists
Mongolian People's Party politicians
Assassinated Mongolian politicians
National University of Mongolia alumni
Mongolian expatriates in the Soviet Union